Ovais Mangalwala (born 18 August 1977), is Pakistani television host, writer, and producer. He is best known for hosting the satirical Express News program "Kaha Sunaa Maaf" from 2012 to 2017. Mangalwala currently hosts Hum News morning show Subah Say Agay.

Early life

Ovais was born and raised in Karachi, Sindh, Pakistan in a Cutchi Memon family to Tanveer Hussain and Shaukat Ara Tanveer. He is married to Hina Ovais and has two sons and one daughter. He attended University of Karachi to complete Masters in Computer Science degree, he also did Master of Business Administration from Karachi Institute of Economics and Technology. Later he completed a diploma in theatre studies from National Academy of Performing Arts located in Karachi.

Career

Ovais started his career with Dawn News in 2007 as associate producer. He produced and hosted Dawn News documentaries, The State of Sharia, Plan B and Parho gaay Likho Gaay. He joined Express News in 2011 and hosted and directed "Kaha Sunaa Maaf", "Karachi Mera Hai" and produced documentaries "Dekh Magar Pyar Se" and award winning documentary "Cheeni Kum" . Mangalwala joined Hum News in 2019 and currently hosts Hum News morning show Subah Say Agay. He also hosts special shows, Eid transmissions for Hum Tv. Ovais has spent 14 years in journalism and recognized by Excellence in Journalism Award in 2016.

See also
 List of Pakistani journalists
 Dawn News
 Express News
 Hum News

References

External links
 Hum Tv Morning Show Subah Say Agay Official Facebook Page
 The State of Sharia  Documentary at Dawn News

1977 births
Living people
Pakistani columnists
Pakistani male journalists
Sindhi people
Pakistani television talk show hosts
Journalists from Karachi
University of Karachi alumni
Urdu-language columnists